Diamantina National Park is a national park in the Channel Country of South West Queensland, Australia,  west of Brisbane. Like the Diamantina River that flows through it, it is named for Lady Diamantina Bowen, wife of Sir George Bowen, the first Governor of Queensland.

Recognition was given for the successful efforts to protect the bilby, an endangered mammal native to Australia.

Livestock was removed from the park in 1998.

Parts of the park contain traditional aboriginal lands.  These are noted for their food resources and numerous habitation sites. Aboriginals would roam the area, moving from the sandhills and gibber country in the wet season and returning to permanent water in the dry season.

Average elevations of the terrain is 139 meters.

Birds
With Astrebla Downs National Park, Diamantina National Park forms part of the  Diamantina and Astrebla Grasslands Important Bird Area, identified by BirdLife International as such because it is one of few sites known for the critically endangered night parrot. It also supports globally important populations of the plains-wanderer, Australian bustard, straw-necked ibis, white-necked heron, inland dotterel, Bourke's parrot, black and pied honeyeaters, gibberbird, Hall's babbler, chestnut-breasted quail-thrush, cinnamon quail-thrush and spinifexbird.

In 2016, a population of the critically endangered night parrot was discovered in the park. The parrot is Australia's rarest bird species.  This discovery significantly expanded the known range and is the largest known population of the species.

See also

 Protected areas of Queensland

Notes

National parks of Queensland
Protected areas established in 1993
1993 establishments in Australia
Important Bird Areas of Queensland
South West Queensland
Shire of Diamantina
Diamantina Lakes, Queensland